The Strathcona Regional District is a regional district in British Columbia, Canada.  It was created on February 15, 2008, encompassing the northern and western portions of the former Regional District of Comox-Strathcona. The partition left the new Strathcona Regional District with 91.6 percent of the former Comox-Strathcona's land area, but only 42.1 percent of its population. Its current territory has a land area of 18,329.948 km2 (7,077.232 sq mi) and a 2016 census population of 44,671 inhabitants. There are 21 named Indian reserves within its territory, with a combined 2016 census population of 1,579 and combined land area of 16.444 km2 (6.345 sq mi).

The District's head offices are in Campbell River, British Columbia.  During a transitional period, much of its administration was carried out by the Comox Valley Regional District, based in Courtenay, British Columbia but it is now self-administered.  It is governed by a board of directors comprising representatives from each of the 5 municipalities and 4 electoral areas within its boundaries.  It is anticipated that the board will expand to include representatives from some of the First Nations governments within its boundaries following treaty settlements.

Most of the Discovery Islands are within the Strathcona Regional District, while a few of the southernmost ones are in the Powell River Regional District.

Demographics 

Note: Totals greater than 100% due to multiple origin responses.

Municipalities

Electoral areas and unincorporated communities
Area A (Kyuquot/Nootka–Sayward)
Nootka Island
Area B (Cortes Island)
Cortes Bay
Mansons Landing
Squirrel Cove
Whaletown
Area C (Discovery Islands–Mainland Inlets)
Heriot Bay
Port Neville
Quathiaski Cove
Refuge Cove
Area D (Oyster Bay–Buttle Lake)
Oyster Bay

Notes

References

External links

 
Regional districts of British Columbia
2008 establishments in British Columbia